Hiérodrame [Gr. ἱερὀς, sacred and δρᾶμα, drama] is a French musical work for two or more voices, with a plot drawn from the Bible. The term was generally used as a synonym for oratorio in France in the 1750s-1780s. Scored for soloists, chorus, and orchestra, the hiérodrame was similar to the grand motet in its structure of solo airs and choruses; however, the texts were taken from newly composed French poems, rather than Latin psalms.  

French oratorios were performed at the Concert Spirituel, rather than in church. Works that were performed at the Concert Spirituel and described as hiérodrames include Le sacrifice d'Abraham (1780, words by Voltaire, music by Cambini); Samson (1783, words by Voltaire, music by Valentin), and Absalon (1786, words by Moline, music by Henri Montan Berton).

References 

Benoit, Marcelle, ed. Dictionnaire de la musique en France aux XVIIe et XVIIIe siècles. Paris: Fayard, 1992, .

Pierre, Constant. Histoire du Concert Spirituel 1725-1790. Paris: Heugel et Cie., 1975.

Smither, Howard E. "Oratorio, Sect. 12," Grove Music Online 

Classical music styles